Governor Columbus may refer to:

Bartholomew Columbus (1460s–1515), Governor of Santo Domingo in the 1490s
Christopher Columbus (1451–1506), 1st Governor of the Indies from 1492 to 1499
Diego Columbus (died 1526), 4th Governor of the Indies from 1509 to 1518